R. salicifolia may refer to:
 Rhaphiolepis salicifolia, a plant species in the genus Rhaphiolepis
 Ruellia salicifolia, a flowering plant species in the genus Ruellia

See also
 Salicifolia (disambiguation)